Cacostola salicicola is a species of beetle in the family Cerambycidae. It was described by Linsley in 1934. It is known from Mexico and the United States.

References

Cacostola
Beetles described in 1934